The Bentley Mulsanne is a full-size luxury car that was manufactured by Bentley from 2010 to 2020. The car is named after the Mulsanne Straight of the Le Mans racing circuit, where Bentley have raced many of its cars throughout history. Designed to replace the Rolls-Royce based Arnage, the Mulsanne was the first flagship car to be independently designed by Bentley Motors since W.O. Bentley's 8 litre model in 1930.

Launch

The Mulsanne nameplate was last used by Bentley for a four-door saloon that was built between 1980 and 1992. It was resurrected as the nameplate for what would become the replacement for the Arnage, Bentley's then flagship model. The new Mulsanne was unveiled at the 2009 Pebble Beach Concours d'Elegance held on 16 August, followed by the 2009 Frankfurt Motor Show, 2010 North American International Auto Show, and the 2012 Qatar Motor Show. At the time of its launch, a coupé and convertible variant were expected to follow at some point as replacements for the Arnage-based Brooklands and Azure respectively but the coupé never came to fruition, while a convertible has been made available towards the end of the production run. Like the Arnage, the Mulsanne retains the  Bentley L Series V8 engine, modified to meet Euro V emissions regulations. The engine is lighter and features cylinder de-activation and variable cam phasing to improve fuel efficiency. Unlike the less expensive Continental Flying Spur and Continental GT, the Mulsanne shares fewer common components with other marques in the Volkswagen Group.

Models

Mulsanne (2010–2020)

The first Mulsanne produced, with chassis number 00001, was sold in 2009 at the Gooding & Company Pebble Beach auction for US$500,000 (US$550,000 after buyer premium) to an undisclosed bidder. Deliveries in England began in Summer 2010.

Features include stainless steel knobs on the dashboard which control the vent plungers, which are electronic micro switches that control electric servos. The feedback remains that of a metal rod to control the damper.

Customers have a choice of 114 exterior colors, 21 carpet colours, nine wood veneers, and 24 interior leather hides, as well as a choice to specify a customized color scheme. The rear seating area may be configured to accommodate either 2 or 3 passengers. A Naim Audio 2,200 watt audio system with MP3, Bluetooth, and an MMI capability is optional.

Winter accessories were introduced in 2011. In 2012, several new features were made available on the 2013 model year; a new optional Bentley-designed luxury bottle cooler and rear cabin storage area, three flutes with white LED accent lighting (designed by David Redman of London), 21-inch five-spoke Sports alloy wheels and optional tinted glass sunroof in the front cabin.

Mulsanne Mulliner Driving Specification (2012–2020)
The Mulsanne Mulliner Driving Specification is a special version of the Mulsanne with 21-inch light aluminum alloy wheels with titanium fasteners, wheels in painted and polished finishes, 265/40 ZR21 tires, wing vents in cast polished stainless steel, Drive Dynamics Control system with 'Sport' setting, leather hide on the front and rear seats and door casings features a 'Diamond Quilting' pattern with indented leather headlining, interior door handles with 'knurled' or 'coined' surface finish, 'Organ Stop' air ventilation controls and gear lever, leather gear lever with Baseball-style cross stitch, accelerator and brake pedals finished in drilled alloy, choice of over 100 exterior colors, unbleached veneers (with two marquetry options), choice of 22 leather hides.

The Mulsanne Mulliner Driving Specification was unveiled at the 2012 Geneva Motor Show, followed by the 2012 New York International Auto Show, 2012 Goodwood Festival of Speed, and 2012 Los Angeles Auto Show.

2013 equipment update

The updated Mulsanne was unveiled at the 2013 Geneva Motor Show.

The Comfort specification includes new comfort headrests with manually adjustable wings for lateral support, new footrests with trimmed in flat-cut cabin carpet and hide, fine duck down filled loose cushions seat and a new rear door armrest storage compartment as standard.

The Premiere Specification includes ambient interior mood lighting, stainless steel external trim, flying 'B' radiator mascot, rear view camera, seat ventilation and massage function along with a veneered iPod drawer.

The Entertainment specification includes picnic tables with iPad and keyboard compartment, an adjustable screen angle with an anti-trap sensor; two 8-inch LCD headrest screens, 20 GB hard drive and DVD player (played through a ‘Naim for Bentley’ audio system), two sets of Bluetooth headphones and a remote control.

Other options include rear cabin privacy curtains, a Wi-Fi router with Universal Mobile Telecommunications System (UMTS) phone module and SIM card reader in glove box, a dedicated antenna housed in the boot lid outside of the vehicle's steel frame, three new colours (Dark Cashmere, Portofino and Damson) and three new hide colours (Damson, Saffron and Brunel).

Mulsanne Speed (2014–2020)

The Speed is the performance derivative of the Mulsanne and offers greater performance and more features compared to the standard model. This gives the Speed a 0– acceleration time of 4.8 seconds, which is 0.3 seconds faster than the standard model. Other features specific to the Speed include a Sports mode in the suspension system settings, more styling features such as a dark tint finish applied to the exterior stainless steel matrix grille, distinctive headlights, a "floating ellipse" design on the rear taillights, Bentley's first ever directional style wheel and tyre set, and twin rifled exhaust tailpipes. Interior features include a 'colour split' with new stitch lines that balances diamond quilted light-color hide with darker, smooth hide, a 60 GB on-board hard drive, electrically-operated tables with recesses and connections for iPads and matching keyboards, and a Wi-Fi hotspot.

Mulsanne Extended Wheelbase (2016–2020)

The Bentley Mulsanne Extended Wheelbase ("EWB") was unveiled during the 2016 Geneva Motor Show, and was designed with the rear-seat passenger in mind. The EWB features an additional  of rear legroom over the standard model, airline-style extending legrests and a rear compartment sunroof. Bentley has developed optional airline-style electronic leg rests for the EWB which are integrated into the bases of the two rear seats. These extend out and pivot, giving the choice between upright, relaxed and reclined seating positions. The large-format sunroof features an Alcantara sunblind, is standard on the EWB, and can be controlled by the passengers or the driver. An optional center console, made from veneer, metal, glass and leather, can be ordered to divide the rear seats. The rear seats can also be specified with folding picnic tables. Electric privacy curtains are fitted as standard to the EWB and can be tailored with either a black or ivory colored lining. Headrests, Alcantara headrest cushions and a powered Alcantara roller blind are additional options unique to the EWB.

Mulsanne Grand Limousine by Mulliner (2016) 

The Mulsanne Grand Limousine was presented at the 2016 Geneva Motor Show. It is 1000 mm longer and has 79mm more headroom in the back than the standard Mulsanne. The car can seat 4 persons in the back thanks to the addition of 2 rear-facing seats. The front seats are separated from the rear ones by an electrochromic glass that can be toggled between transparent and opaque.

No less than 10 examples exist.

Special models

Mulsanne Diamond Jubilee Edition (2012)

The Mulsanne Diamond Jubilee Edition is a limited (60 units) version of the Mulsanne commemorating Queen Elizabeth II's birthday and Diamond Jubilee. Notable changes included bespoke embroidery to all four headrests using gold stitching, veneered picnic tables in the rear cabin decorated with a gold overlay depicting a royal carriage, hide cushions featuring the same motif, polished stainless steel treadplate plaques with 'Bentley Mulliner, England' script and 'Diamond Jubilee Edition'.

The model was unveiled at the Beijing International Automotive Exhibition in Sanlitun district.

Mulsanne Executive Interior (2012)
The design of the Mulsanne Executive Interior was based on the Mulsanne Executive Interior Concept. The car is offered in two specifications, Theatre and iPad. The iPad Specification includes 2 electrically-deployed veneered picnic tables for rear passengers (colour-matched to the seats of the Mulsanne) and two iPads with wireless keyboards. Mulsanne Theatre Specification includes a 15.6-inch centrally located HD LED screen or 8-inch screens fitted within the front seat headrests and a boot-mounted Apple Mac computer.

The Mulsanne Executive Interior with iPad Specification was unveiled at the 2012 Moscow International Auto Salon.

Mulsanne Le Mans Edition (2013)
The Mulsanne Le Mans Edition is a limited version (48 units per model) of the Mulsanne for the North American market, commemorating Bentley's six victories at the 24 Hours of Le Mans. Each car included a unique Le Mans Edition numbered badge, Le Mans Edition clock face, embroidered Le Mans badge to each headrest, tread plates with the limited edition name, unique Le Mans Edition wheels and specific interior veneers and exterior colors. The LeMans Edition consisted of six models, named after the winning drivers:

The models were unveiled at the 2013 Pebble Beach Concours d'Elegance and went on sale in third quarter of 2013.

Mulsanne Shaheen (2013)
The Shaheen is a Limited Edition version of the Bentley Mulsanne equipped with the Mulliner Driving Specification as standard. The Shaheen was unveiled at the 2013 Dubai Motor Show and specifically developed for the Middle East market, with design details inspired by the Shaheen eagle, a bird of prey found in the Middle East. Changes include Tungsten over Onyx paintwork inspired by the colourings of the Shaheen eagle, Magnolia and Beluga leather interior upholstery, Dark Stained Burr Walnut Veneer, a bespoke signature Mulsanne Shaheen logo on the rear iPad picnic tables using a gold overlay, iPad picnic tables, a Wi-Fi hotspot, a large tilt-opening tinted glass sunroof, and an electrically operated bottle cooler.

Mulsanne Seasons Collector's Editions (2013)

The Mulsanne Seasons Collector's Editions (慕尚四季臻藏版) are limited (10 units for each of orchids (Spring), bamboo (Summer), chrysanthemums (Autumn), and plum (Winter); 1 unit for Golden Pine (Whole Year Edition)) versions of 2014 Bentley Mulsanne with Mulliner Driving Specification for China market, inspired China's culture. Designed with Lin Xi's interpretation of the Chinese 'Four Seasons', all models include 21-inch Mulliner Polished Wheel, twin picnic tables. Each model includes a season-specific theme (except Golden Pine):

The vehicles were unveiled at the 2013 Guangzhou International Auto Show. The Golden Pine car was sold for 8,880,000 yuan, while other models were sold for 6,880,000 yuan.

Birkin Edition Mulsanne (2014)
The Birkin Edition is a Limited Edition model of the Bentley Mulsanne equipped with the Mulliner Driving Specification and Entertainment Specification (twin 8-inch LCD screens in the rear of the seat headrests, a DVD player, a Wi-Fi hotspot, the Naim for Bentley audio system and iPads integrated into the hand-crafted solid wood picnic tables) as standard. The Birkin Edition was inspired by Sir Henry ‘Tiger’ Tim Birkin and limited to 22 units exclusively for the European market. Other features specific to this model include a choice of 3 body colour schemes (Ghost White, Damson, and a contrast of Fountain Blue and Dark Sapphire), numbered door sill plaques, a 21-inch wheel design inspired by those on the original Mulsanne concept car, a 3D 'Flying B' logo stitched into the vehicle headrests and inlaid into the wood of the front fascia and rear picnic tables, a luggage set individually numbered and hand-crafted to match with the interior of each car.

Mulsanne 95 (2014)
The 95 is a Limited Edition version of the Bentley Mulsanne developed to celebrate the company's 95th anniversary, and limited to 15 units reserved for the UK market. Exterior colour options unique to the 95 include Britannia Blue, Empire Red or Oxford White over an interior of blue and white two-tone leather divided by red stitching. Other features specific to this model include the words ‘Ninety Five’ joined by Union Jack Flags on illuminated treadplates, the number ’95’ is also embroidered onto the front and rear seats, the Flying 'B' bonnet mascot with a darker tint, and wood veneer that Bentley claims is sourced from a fallen walnut tree aged between 300 and 400 years old.

Mulsanne Speed "Blue Train" Edition (2015)
The "Blue Train" is a Limited Edition version of the Bentley Mulsanne Speed created to celebrate the 1930 Bentley Speed Six coupé that outran the so-called "Blue Train" Calais-Mediterranée Express from Cannes to Calais, going so far as to return to London four minutes before the train reached the English Channel. A total of four Bentley Mulsanne Speed "Blue Train" models would be built, in celebration of the four-minute victory. Two of the cars were rendered in Beluga (solid black) and the other two cars were open to custom paint schemes. Other features specific to this model include 21-inch black wheels with polished centers, a chrome grille surround with a black square-mesh insert evocative of the original Blue Train, a Bentley Driver's Club badge fixed to the grille, a retractable Flying 'B' engraved with the words "Blue Train 85 Years", Burnt Oak and Camel leather, door stitch patterns that mimic the original car, sill plates and headrests showcasing the original car's silhouette, and a rendering of the original car in the burr walnut passenger-side wood veneer. The first production unit featured a unique picnic set, trimmed with the same two-tone leathers as the interior of the car, containing Robbe & Berking silver cutlery, Haviland Limoges porcelain, 'champagne flutes', and an Angora picnic rug. The Mulliner team handcrafted the leather cutlery holders as well as the leather rug holder which featured "Blue Train" embroidery. The picnic set was offered as an option for the other three cars.

Mulsanne W.O. Edition (2018–2020)

The Mulsanne W.O. Edition was presented at the 2018 Geneva Motor Show as a 100th anniversary celebration of the founding of Bentley Motors by W.O. Bentley. Designed by Mulliner, each W.O. Edition is claimed to feature a piece of the crankshaft from W.O. Bentley's personal car, displayed in the arm rest in an integrated display case. The interior is upholstered in leather, and the dashboard contains the owner's signature. The signature is also present on the front bumper, and special badges are located on the sills and wheel centres.

The exterior colour scheme is reminiscent of the Bentley 8 Litre, and features a two-tone paint scheme with chrome present on the radiator grille and bonnet strip. Production is limited to 100 units.

Mulsanne 6.75 Edition by Mulliner (2020)
Due to the increasingly stringent emission regulations, the Mulsanne was discontinued in 2020. Bentley unveiled the final edition of the Mulsanne called the "Mulsanne 6.75 Edition by Mulliner" which is limited to 30 units. This model marks the end of the Mulsanne production, the end of the Mulsanne as Bentley's flagship model, and the end of the world's longest continuously produced V8 engine, spanning 60 years. The 6¾-litre V8 engine, introduced in 1959 and heavily revised and updated in 2010, could not be updated any further to meet newer emission regulations, namely  emissions. No replacement for either Mulsanne or 6¾-litre V8 engine is planned. Instead, the third generation Flying Spur would replace the Mulsanne as Bentley's flagship model.

Concept cars

Executive Interior Concept (2011) 
The Mulsanne Executive Interior Concept is a version of the Mulsanne demonstrating a new multimedia connectivity concept. It included two electric-powered, foldable wood veneer picnic tables in the rear cabin, each with Apple iPad and Apple Bluetooth keyboards; Apple Mac Mini stored in boot compartment, roof console with  High Definition LED dropdown monitor, illuminated rear centre console fitted with twin individual armrests, rear console with Apple iPod (control panel), two cup holders, tissue box and large stowage area; Apple iPod controls (Rear Seat Entertainment (RSE) and audio system, Apple Media Centre, plays music and access to internet), 2 USB connectors provided for the Apple system and one Apple interface connector for the iPod, control keys on rear console operate picnic tables, reading lights, control HD LED screen and select video and audio options; Armrest with Tibaldi pen and 'Privacy Telephone handset', bottle cooler in rear centre console with illuminated double-glazed frosted glass door, additional multi-directional reading lights provided for each rear passenger and can be operated with Apple devices, mood lighting in the rear centre console (using multiple soft glowing LEDs), illuminated docking station and cup holders.

The vehicle was unveiled at the 2011 Los Angeles Auto Show.

Mulsanne Grand Convertible Concept (2014) 
The Bentley Grand Convertible is a four-seat, luxury convertible concept car from Bentley Motors. The car debuted at the 2014 LA Auto Show.

Specifications

Engines

Transmissions

Production and marketing
Production of the Mulsanne began at the Crewe plant in Spring 2010 and ended in Summer 2020. Each car took about 400 hours to produce.

The 6¾-litre V8 engine is built at the Crewe plant, and takes nearly 30 hours to build.

As part of Mulsanne Seasons Collector's Editions launch, Breitling SA produced a Breitling for Bentley B04 GMT Mulsanne wrist watch.
During the Mulsanne Seasons Collector's Editions launch in 2013 Guangzhou International Auto Show, the 1000th Chinese customer for Bentley Mulsanne was announced.

Motorsport
A Mulsanne competed in the 2012 Goodwood Festival of Speed hill climb.

A Mulsanne was used as the 2012 Nürburgring 24 Hour Race official parade car.

References

External links

 Bentley Mulsanne website
 Virtual tour Bentley Mulsanne interior
 Bentley Mulsanne 2020

Mulsanne
Cars introduced in 2010
Flagship vehicles
Full-size vehicles
Limousines
Luxury vehicles
Police vehicles
Sports sedans